Charles Weir (2 May 1874 – 3 June 1955) was a South African cricketer. He played in four first-class matches for Border from 1897/98 to 1903/04.

See also
 List of Border representative cricketers

References

External links
 

1874 births
1955 deaths
South African cricketers
Border cricketers
Sportspeople from Qonce